Chris Wallace (born 1947) is an American newscaster for CNN.

Chris, Christine or Christopher Wallace may also refer to:

 Chris Wallace (computer scientist) (1933–2004), Australian computer scientist and physicist, developer of Minimum Message Length
 Chris Wallace (musician) (born 1982), lead vocalist for The White Tie Affair
 Chris Wallace (EastEnders), an EastEnders character in 2001
 Chris Wallace (basketball) (active since 1986), basketball executive
 Chris Wallace (American football) (born 1975), American football quarterback
 Christine Wallace (born 1960), Australian political journalist, biographer and academic
 Christopher Wallace or The Notorious B.I.G. (1972–1997), American rapper
 Christopher Wallace (British Army officer) (1943–2016), British Army general and trustee of the Imperial War Museum
 Christopher Jordan Wallace or C. J. Wallace (born 1996), American actor

See also
 Chris Wallace-Crabbe (born 1934), Australian poet and professor